Big Jim McLain is a 1952 American film noir political thriller film starring John Wayne and James Arness as HUAC investigators hunting down communists in the postwar Hawaii organized-labor scene. Edward Ludwig directed.

This was the first film in which Wayne played a contemporary law enforcement officer, instead of an Old West lawman. Near the end of his career, in the mid-1970s, he took on two more such roles, (Brannigan and McQ), each time playing an urban cop.

Plot
House Un-American Activities Committee (HUAC) investigators Jim McLain (Wayne) and Mal Baxter (Arness) come to Hawaii to track American Communist Party activities. They are interested in everything from insurance fraud to the sabotage of a U.S. naval vessel and plans to have local unions go on strike to prevent the loading and unloading of ships on the Honolulu docks.

After receiving useful information from reporter Phil Briggs (Vernon "Red" McQueen), the agents begin searching for Willie Nomaka, a former party treasurer, who has allegedly experienced a nervous breakdown and is being treated by psychiatrist Dr. Gelster (Gayne Whitman). The doctor's secretary, Nancy Vallon (Nancy Olson), is helpful, as well. McLain asks her on a date and a romance develops.

Nomaka's landlady, Madge (Veda Ann Borg), assists in the investigation, flirting with McLain. Nomaka's ex-wife (Madame Soo Yong) also helps McLain. Nomaka is eventually found under another name in a sanitorium, heavily drugged and unable to speak. Party leader Sturak (Alan Napier) gives orders to Dr. Gelster to get rid of him, but McLain rescues Nomaka and takes him to safety. However, two of the communists kidnap Baxter, and Gelster accidentally kills him by giving him an injection of truth serum.

Sturak orders the members of the communist cell to attend a meeting. Sturak orders Gelster to confess his party membership to the authorities and identify several nonessential members of the "cell" so the government will believe that the cell has been destroyed and the others can continue their work. The meeting is interrupted by McLain, who punches out one of the communists after the communist uses the "N-word". McLain is losing the brawl that follows, but the police arrive and place the communists under arrest. The men responsible for Baxter's death are convicted of murder, but ultimately McLain and Nancy Vallon see the others plead the Fifth Amendment and go free.

Cast
 John Wayne as Jim McLain
 James Arness as Mal Baxter
 Nancy Olson as Nancy Vallon
 Alan Napier as Sturak
 Vernon "Red" McQueen as Phil Briggs  
 Gayne Whitman as Dr. Gelster
 Veda Ann Borg as Madge
 Robert Keys as Edwin White
 Sarah Padden as Mrs. Lexiter

Production notes
  The film was shot entirely on location in Hawaii and includes scenes of Pearl Harbor, Molokai, Waikiki, and downtown Honolulu from  30 April to 16 June 1952.
 Several of the people cast in the film were Honolulu citizens - Honolulu Chief of Police Dan Liu, news reporter Vernon "Red" McQueen, wrestling champion Zinko "Lucky" Simunovich, University of Hawaii professor Joel Trapido, Bishop Kinai Ikuma, Sam "Steamboat" Mokuaki, Charles "Panama" Baptiste, Rennie Brooks, Akira Fukunaza, and Ralph Honda. Also in the cast was Edwin Layton, Admiral Nimitz's Chief of intelligence, who successfully deduced Yamamoto's attack on the island of Midway in June 1942. He later co-wrote the book, "And I Was There: Pearl Harbor and Midway—Breaking the Secrets," New York: William Morrow.(1985)
 Its world premiere was in Kohio, Hawaii, on 28 August 1952.
 The film was rushed into release to beat two other John Wayne films, RKO's Jet Pilot, which was not released until 1957, and Republic's The Quiet Man.
 After the opening credits, a voice-over narrator recites quotes from the short story "The Devil and Daniel Webster" by Stephen Vincent Benet, immediately followed by a voice-over tribute to the HUAC for its pursuit of inquiries "undaunted by the vicious campaign of slander launched against them."
 A title card at the end of the film states that the incidents in the film were based on the files of the committee, although names and places were changed, and acknowledges the cooperation of the committee in the making of the film.
 Nancy Olson hated the script, but figured that six weeks in Hawaii and a chance to work with a star like John Wayne seemed good enough reasons to accept. She thought the film would flop and nobody would see it. She was right to a degree – it was not one of Wayne's more successful pictures – but she did not count on how often it would appear on television. She later said people stopped her all the time to mention it. Olson, a staunch liberal Democrat, said Wayne and she would often have political arguments, but she would always let Wayne have the last word. 
 John Wayne recorded an advertisement for Camel cigarettes on the set.
 In some European markets, the film was retitled as Marijuana and omitted the communist angle, making the villains drug dealers, instead. This was achieved entirely through script changes and dubbing.
 The film's publicity slogan was: "He's A Go-Get-'Em Guy for the U.S.A. on a Treason Trail That Leads Half-a-World Away!"
 James Arness, who played the title character's sidekick in the film, later played a police officer named Jim McClain in the short-lived 1980s TV series "McClain's Law". No explicit connection between the movie and the TV show was ever acknowledged, but Arness' character was addressed as "Big Jim McClain" in a scene from the series' movie-length pilot.

See also
John Wayne filmography

References

External links

1952 films
1950s spy films
Film noir
1950s English-language films
Films directed by Edward Ludwig
Films set in Hawaii
Films shot in Hawaii
American political thriller films
American spy films
Cold War films
American anti-communist propaganda films
Cold War spy films
Warner Bros. films
Batjac Productions films
Films produced by John Wayne
Communism in fiction
Films scored by Emil Newman
Films scored by Paul Dunlap
American black-and-white films
Films set in Honolulu
Films shot in Honolulu
1950s American films